The Mid and West Wales Fire and Rescue Service is the fire and rescue service covering the Welsh principal areas of Carmarthenshire, Ceredigion, Neath Port Talbot, Pembrokeshire, Powys and Swansea.

The service was created in 1996 by the Local Government (Wales) Act 1994 which reformed Welsh local government. It was created by a merger of the earlier Dyfed, Powys and West Glamorgan fire brigades.

It has 57 fire stations, and around 1,400 staff.

Since October 2017, the service has shared its control room with South Wales Fire and Rescue Service and South Wales Police at the police headquarters,
an arrangement that is expected to save £1million annually across both fire and rescue services.

The fire authority which administers the service is a joint-board, made up of councillors appointed from Carmarthenshire, Ceredigion, Neath Port Talbot, Pembrokeshire, Powys and Swansea councils.

See also
List of British firefighters killed in the line of duty

References

External links

Fire and rescue services of Wales
Organisations based in Carmarthenshire
Ceredigion
Neath Port Talbot
Pembrokeshire
Powys
Swansea